The World Indoor Soccer League (WISL) was a United States-based indoor soccer league that existed from 1998 to 2001 and consisted of nine teams.

History
After the demise of the Continental Indoor Soccer League, four of its teams decided to create a new indoor league to be called the Premier Soccer Alliance. The teams complemented their schedules with games against international teams. In 1999, two more former CISL teams (the Houston Hotshots and Monterrey La Raza) joined the league, which then changed its name to World Indoor Soccer League.

The name change came about as a result of the "merger" of the US-based Premier Soccer Alliance and an 'English Indoor Football League'. Originally, there was to be a European Division and a North American Division, with 'London United', 'Manchester Magic', 'Newcastle Geordies' and 'Sheffield Strikers' playing in a European division, but that idea was dropped due to rules conflicts between the existing leagues and lack of permission from The Football Association.

At one point in 2000, the World Indoor Soccer League attempted to be the first U.S. pro sports league to sell the sell naming rights of the league.  It was looking to be something like "The Pepsi World Indoor Soccer League." Ultimately, this did not happen.

The WISL folded in December 2001 when Dallas, St. Louis, and San Diego agreed to join the MISL while the remaining teams, the Utah Freezz, the Sacramento Knights and the Houston Hotshots folded.

Champions

Season by Season

By Team

Annual awards

Most Valuable Player
 1998 – Tatu, Dallas
 1999 – David Doyle, Dallas
 2000 – Mariano Bollella, Monterrey
 2001 – Ato Leone, Sacramento

Goalkeeper of the Year
1998 – Dan Madsen, Sacramento 
1999 – Brett Phillips, Portland 
2000 – Sagu (Edilson Xavier), Dallas 
2001 – Sagu (Edilson Xavier), Dallas

Coach of the Year
 1998 – Tatu, Dallas
 1999 – Iain Fraser, Sacramento
 2000 – Jeff Betts, Utah
 2001 – Iain Fraser, Sacramento

Rookie of the Year
 1998 – Jorge Fernandez, Sacramento
 1999 – Justin Labrum, Utah
 2000 – Clint Regier, Houston
 2001 – David Beltran, San Diego

Defender of the Year
 1998 – Rusty Troy, Dallas
 1999 – Iain Fraser, Sacramento
 2000 – Rob Baarts, Utah
 2001 – Iain Fraser, Sacramento

Presidents
Gordon Jago 1998–2001

Teams

References

 
Organizations disestablished in 2001
Defunct indoor soccer leagues in the United States
1998 in American soccer leagues
1999 in American soccer leagues
2000 in American soccer leagues
2001 in American soccer leagues